Ojitlán Chinantec (Chinanteco de San Lucas Ojitlán) is a major Chinantecan language of Mexico, spoken in four towns in San Lucas Ojitlán of northern Oaxaca, and in the Veracruz municipos of Minatitlán and Hidalgotitlán.

Writing system
Several spellings of Chinantec of Ojitlán have been developed. The Institute National for Adult Education (INEA) and SIL International use different spellings.

In the spelling of INEA, the high tone is indicated using the acute accent of the letter of the vowel, the medium tone by the absence of a diacritic above or below it , the low tone using the underlined line, and the very low tone using the double underlined line. This spelling uses seven letters for the vowels: ‹ a, e, ɇ, i, ɨ, o, u ›.

Phonology

Vowels 
There are only a few monomorphemic words that display contrastive vowel length, so this Chinantecan feature may be being lost from Ojitlán.

Consonants 

 is uncommon.

Some consonants are nearly in complementary distribution: 
 only occurs before , whereas  rarely occurs before .

 is occasionally a single-contract trill, and post-pausa may be .

 is apical alveolar. 

The voiceless sonorants are analyzed as  sequences in other Chinantecan languages, and in addition there is a series of  sequences  in Ojitlán.

Tones 
Syllables may be unstressed or have normal stress. Normal stress involves increased length and amplitude of the vowel. What was historically ballistic stress is realized in Ojitlán as extra-high and extra-low tones (from ballistic high and ballistic falling, respectively), and tend to involve aspiration of the consonant, breathiness of the vowel and a sharp falling pitch but not the other correlates of Chinantecan ballistic syllables.  There are also a number of phonemic (as opposed to just phonetic) contour tones, though the number had not been established as of Macaulay (1999).

References

Chinantec languages